Thorp High School is a secondary school in Thorp, in Clark County, Wisconsin, United States. The school is located just north of Wisconsin Highway 29 in the small community of Thorp, Wisconsin which is 60 miles west of Wausau and 42 miles east of Eau Claire.

Demographics

Athletic
Thorp High Offers the following athletic activities in the Cloverbelt Conference. 
 Basketball (boys and girls)
 Baseball
 Cheerleading
 Football
 Golf
 Softball
 Track
 Wrestling
 Volleyball

Thorp High School athletic state championships include football (1993), boys basketball (2014), and softball (2016).

References

External links
 School District of Thorp official website
  City Data and Education Profile

Public high schools in Wisconsin
Schools in Clark County, Wisconsin